Benny Loves You is a 2019 horror comedy film directed, written, and produced by Karl Holt. It stars Claire Cartwright, George Collie, James Parsons, David Wayman, Lydia Hourihan and Holt himself. The film premiered at the Buenos Aires Rojo Sangre on November 21, 2019.

Plot
Ashley, a spoiled brat, gets a new present and discards her old teddy bear. That night, the teddy bear pulls her into a closet and rips her eyes out.

Jack, a failed toy designer, continuously depends on his parents, until they are killed in a freak accident on his 35th birthday. Ten months later, Jack is struggling financially from living on his own without support and dealing with maintenance and mortgage, while getting convinced by a man named David to sell his house. Jack also sees his colleague, Richard, as a competition, as he won the designer of the year award. Due to the failures of his toy designs, Jack is subsequently fired by his boss, Ron, and rehired for a lower waged position, instead of being promoted.

Jack decides to become an adult and sell his house, packs his toys, and to Jack's sadness, throws away a stuffed puppy named Benny, his favorite childhood toy. However, Benny destroys all of Jack's plush toys, which prompts him to call two police officers over for an investigation. However, they just insult Jack and eat his biscuits. At work, Jack meets Dawn, a tech consultant, and begins a relationship.

At home, Jack finds David's head on the bed beside him, and the next morning, his body slumped on a chair, and his blood is all over the house. He immediately cleans up his house and narrowly avoids getting caught when the police officers come by to get something they left in his house the day before. After Benny shreds a cat with a lawnmower, Jack makes Benny promise that he will stay here as long as he does not murder anyone else.

Jack is inspired by Benny to create several toy designs, which impresses Ron and his relationship grows closer with Dawn. A realtor shows a woman named Tara about Jack's house, which is on sale, but Benny impales the realtor with a wooden sign and forces Tara to hide for a long period of time in Jack's attic. Jack comes home and is shocked at Benny again, so he keeps him in a box for his date night with Dawn.

Benny frees himself as Ron drops off Precious, his dog, which Benny kills by hacking it in the back with a hatchet. Dawn shares a tragic backstory of when her father tripped over her favorite doll, Amy, and broke his neck. Jack decides to fake Precious' death by stabbing him and throwing him out the window and onto Ron's car, to allegedly protect Dawn from him.

Ron fires Jack, but Benny does not realize that Jack is upset, and even tries to play with the very stressed-out Jack. Benny kidnaps Ron, and Jack sees this as an opportunity to get his job back, but Benny throws a garden tool into Ron's throat before he is rehired. Jack buries Benny in the woods and spends time with Dawn while they clean up Ron's murder. Benny hitches a ride on Dawn's car, where Jack tries to claim that Benny is dangerous, just to be mocked and laughed at by his colleagues. Benny stabs Richard in the hand, and Jack, Dawn, and Richard escape the room, locking Benny inside, who subsequently massacres the remaining workers.

Jack, Dawn, and Richard go back to Jack's house to formulate a plan against Benny, even though Richard is pessimistic. Benny gears up with weapons, while at the same time, the trio booby-traps the house. Benny makes his way into Jack's house through his toilet. Dawn is surprised by Benny with her childhood doll, Amy. Richard gets stabbed and has his organs sucked out by his toy Rosco, which earlier, he discarded. Jack and Dawn continue fighting with Benny and Amy, respectively, which ends in Amy being stabbed and Benny leaping out of the window and shot to death by the same police officers from earlier.

Two months later, Jack and Dawn are starting a new life, with the two police officers covering for them about Benny. In a post-credit scene, Tara is seen dead in the attic, having hidden there for a long time and having succumbed to starvation/dehydration.

Cast
 Karl Holt as Jack / Benny
 Claire Cartwright as Dawn
 George Collie as Richard
 James Parsons as Ron
 Anthony Styles as Bad Cop
 Darren Benedict as Good Cop
 Lydia Hourihan as Tara
 David Wayman as Phil
 Jennifer Healy as Ashley's Mother
 Bella Munday as Ashley
 Catriona McDonald as Jack's Mother
 Greg Barnett as David
 Logan Murray as Young Jack
 Greg Page as Jack's Dad

Production

Filming began in 2014 and was completed in 2015. The main reason for the gap between filming and release was due to the fact that Holt edited, scored and did the visual effects.

Release
The film premiered at the Buenos Aires Rojo Sangre on November 21, 2019, New York City Horror Film Festival on December 8, 2019, Sitges Film Festival on October 8, 2020, Trieste Science+Fiction Festival on November 1, 2020 and Panic Film Fest in Kansas City on April 9 to April 15, 2021.

Benny Loves You was released in UK on February 19, 2021, and was scheduled to premiere in the United States in selected theaters on May 7 before becoming available on demand on May 11, 2021. The film's Blu-ray release was on June 8, 2021.

Benny Loves You was selected at the 25th Bucheon International Fantastic Film Festival (BIFAN) in South Korea, held in July 2021. It was showcased in the World Fantastic Red section of the festival.

Reception
The site's consensus reads, "A zany entry into the sentient murder toy genre, Benny Loves You is an enjoyably macabre and clever horror comedy that will have audiences rooting for its loveable villain."

Anton Bitel of Sight & Sound wrote:

References

External links
 
 
 
 

2019 comedy horror films
2019 films
British comedy horror films
Puppet films
Films about sentient toys
2019 independent films
American comedy horror films
American robot films
American splatter films
2010s English-language films
Warner Bros. films
Horror films about toys
American independent films
2010s American films
2010s British films